The following are people of Hispanic descent born outside of Latin America and Spain who have been nominated for or have won an Academy Award, along with the flag of the country of their Hispanic ancestry. All people listed were born in the United States.

Acting categories

Best Actor

Best Actress

Best Supporting Actor

Best Supporting Actress

Animated categories

Best Animated Feature

Best Cinematography

Documentary categories

Best Documentary (Short Subject)

Best Makeup and Hairstyling

Music categories

Best Original Score

Best Original Song

Best Visual Effects category

Screenplay categories

Best Original Screenplay

See also
List of Latin American Academy Award winners and nominees
Lists of Hispanic Academy Award winners and nominees by country

References

Lists of Academy Award winners and nominees by nationality or region
Lists of Academy Award winners by ethnicity